Events in the year 2020 in Brazil.

Incumbents

Federal government 
President: Jair Bolsonaro
Vice President: Hamilton Mourão

Governors
 Acre: Gladson Cameli
 Alagoas: Renan Filho
 Amapa: Waldez Góes
 Amazonas: Wilson Lima
 Bahia: Rui Costa (politician)
 Ceará: Camilo Santana
 Distrito Federal: Ibaneis Rocha
 Espírito Santo: Renato Casagrande
 Goiás: Ronaldo Caiado
 Maranhão: Flávio Dino
 Mato Grosso: Mauro Mendes
 Mato Grosso do Sul: Reinaldo Azambuja
 Minas Gerais: Romeu Zema
 Pará: Helder Barbalho
 Paraíba: João Azevedo
 Paraná: Ratinho Júnior
 Pernambuco: Paulo Câmara
 Piauí: Wellington Dias
 Rio de Janeiro: Wilson Witzel & Cláudio Castro
 Rio Grande do Norte: Fátima Bezerra
 Rio Grande do Sul: Eduardo Leite
 Rondônia: Marcos Rocha
 Roraima: Antonio Denarium
 Santa Catarina: Carlos Moisés
 São Paulo: João Doria
 Sergipe: Belivaldo Chagas
 Tocantins: Mauro Carlesse

Vice governors
 Acre: Wherles Fernandes da Rocha
 Alagoas: José Luciano Barbosa da Silva
 Amapá: Jaime Domingues Nunes
 Amazonas: Carlos Alberto Souza de Almeida Filho
 Bahia: João Leão
 Ceará: Maria Izolda Cela de Arruda Coelho
 Espírito Santo: Jacqueline Moraes da Silva
 Goiás: Lincoln Graziane Pereira da Rocha
 Maranhão: Carlos Orleans Brandão Júnior
 Mato Grosso: Otaviano Olavo Pivetta
 Mato Grosso do Sul: Murilo Zauith
 Minas Gerais: Paulo Brant
 Pará: Lúcio Dutra Vale 
 Paraíba: Lígia Feliciano
 Paraná: Darci Piana
 Pernambuco: Luciana Barbosa de Oliveira Santos
 Piaui: Regina Sousa
 Rio de Janeiro: Cláudio Castro
 Rio Grande do Norte: Antenor Roberto
 Rio Grande do Sul: Ranolfo Vieira Júnior
 Rondônia: José Atílio Salazar Martins
 Roraima: Frutuoso Lins Cavalcante Neto
 Santa Catarina: Daniela Cristina Reinehr
 São Paulo: Rodrigo Garcia
 Sergipe: Eliane Aquino Custódio
 Tocantins: Wanderlei Barbosa Castro

Events

 January 17 - Roberto Alvim who was Special Secretary for Culture under the auspices of the Ministry of Tourism, only to be fired on January 17, 2020 after appearing to quote a speech by German Nazi politician Joseph Goebbels in a government-sanctioned video.
January 21 – Journalist Glenn Greenwald (The Intercept) is charged with cybercrimes in connection to his reporting on corruption.
January 22 – Brazil is seen as the seventh most corrupt country in the world.
January 29 – The United States Department of Homeland Security (DHS) says that it has started sending Brazilians back into Mexico as increasing numbers seek asylum in the U.S.

May 22 – COVID-19 pandemic: Brazil overtakes Russia to become second on the list of countries with the highest number of COVID-19 cases, as its total reported number exceeds 330,000.

Deaths

January
January 6 – Luís Morais (Cabeção), 89, footballer (b. 1930)

March
March 25 – Martinho Lutero Galati, 66, conductor (b. 1953); COVID-19.
March 26 – Naomi Munakata, 64, conductor (b. 1955); COVID-19.
March 27 – Daniel Azulay, 72, cartoonist (b. 1947); COVID-19.

April
April 4 – Florindo Corral, 70, businessperson; COVID-19
April 14 – Aldo di Cillo Pagotto, archbishop (b. 1949).
April 21 – Gerson Peres, journalist (b. 1931).
April 25 – Ricardo Brennand, art collector and entrepreneur (b. 1927).
April 27 – Asdrubal Bentes, politician (b. 1939).

May
May 1 – Fernando Sandoval, water polo player (b. 1942).
May 4 – Aldir Blanc, composer (b. 1946).
May 5 – Ciro Pessoa, singer-songwriter (b. 1957).
May 7 – Daisy Lúcidi, actress (b. 1929).
May 8
Lúcia Braga, politician (b. 1934).
Vicente André Gomes, politician and physician (b. 1952).
May 9
Carlos José, singer-songwriter (b. 1934).
Abraham Palatnik, artist (b. 1928).
May 10
David Corrêa, singer-songwriter (b. 1937).
Sérgio Sant'Anna, writer (b. 1941).

December
December 20 – Nicette Bruno, actress (b. 1933)

References

 		

 
Years of the 21st century in Brazil
Brazil
Brazil
2020s in Brazil